In combinatorial mathematics, Stanley's reciprocity theorem, named after MIT mathematician Richard P. Stanley, states that a certain functional equation is satisfied by the generating function of any rational cone (defined below) and the generating function of the cone's interior.

Definitions 
A rational cone is the set of all d-tuples

(a1, ..., ad) 

of nonnegative integers satisfying a system of inequalities

where M is a matrix of integers.  A d-tuple satisfying the corresponding strict inequalities, i.e., with ">" rather than "≥", is in the interior of the cone.

The generating function of such a cone is

The generating function Fint(x1, ..., xd) of the interior of the cone is defined in the same way, but one sums over d-tuples in the interior rather than in the whole cone.

It can be shown that these are rational functions.

Formulation 
Stanley's reciprocity theorem states that for a rational cone as above, we have

Matthias Beck and Mike Develin have shown how to prove this by using the calculus of residues.  Develin has said that this amounts to proving the result "without doing any work".

Stanley's reciprocity theorem generalizes Ehrhart-Macdonald reciprocity for Ehrhart polynomials of rational convex polytopes.

See also
 Ehrhart polynomial

References

 
 

Algebraic combinatorics
Theorems in combinatorics